The 4th Okinawa International Movie Festival was held from March 24 to March 31, 2012 and took place at the Okinawa Convention Center in Ginowan City and Sakurazaka Theater in Naha, owned and run by Japanese director Yuji Nakae. Total attendance was 410,000.

The fourth Okinawa International Movie Festival also included 'Okinawa Contents Land', in which 50 companies from around Asia showcased their products and services. Other events included the Pachinko Movie Awards for gamblers, a fashion show led by model and singer Anna Tsuchiya, live music and comedy from Okinawan artists Rimi Natsukawa and Begin, and the Okinawa Elementary School Movie Festival, which nurtures filmmakers of the future.

26 films were screened in competition, The Golden Shisa Award going to A Simple Life by director Ann Hui from Hong Kong.

Official selection
The official selection of films was broken into two categories, Laugh and Peace, each with 13 entrants. The former focuses on comedy films, while the latter includes dramas and documentaries with elements of comedy. Organizers focused on Asian films for this edition of the festival. Before each screening, every film was introduced by one of Yoshimoto Kogyo's comedians. 102 films in total were shown.

Competition

Laugh Category
The following films were selected as In Competition for the Laugh Category:

Peace Category
The following films were selected as In Competition for the Peace Category:

Out of Competition
The following films were screened out of competition:
Panoramic Screening

Jury

Competition
 Qiu Fu-Sheng, Taiwanese producer
 Hu Mei, Chinese filmmaker
 Michael Hui, Hong Kong comedian and filmmaker
 Cho Young-Jeung, Busan International Film Festival programmer
 Masahide Ota, Former governor of Okinawa

Awards

Official selection

In Competition
The Golden Shisa Award was won by A Simple Life directed by Ann Hui.

The Laugh Category Uminchu Prize Grand Prix went to Thai musical drama SuckSeed directed by Chayanop Boonprakob.

The Peace Category Uminchu Prize Grand Prix was won by A Simple Life directed by Ann Hui.

See also
 Okinawa International Movie Festival

References

External links
 Okinawa International Movie Festival official website (in English)
 Official Okinawa International Movie Festival Facebook Page

Film festivals in Japan
March 2012 events in Japan
2012 in Japanese cinema
2012 film festivals
2012 festivals in Asia

ja:沖縄国際映画祭